69 Orionis is a single star in the equatorial constellation of Orion, positioned a couple of degrees to the north of Xi Orionis. It has the Bayer designation f1 Orionis; 69 Orionis is the Flamsteed designation. The star is visible to the naked eye as faint, blue-white hued point of light with an apparent visual magnitude of 4.92. It is located approximately 530 light-years from the Sun based on parallax, and is drifting further away with a radial velocity of +22 km/s. In 2015, H. Bouy and J. Alves suggested that it is a member of the newly discovered Taurion OB association.

This object is a B-type main-sequence star with a stellar classification of B5Vn, where the 'n' suffix indicates "nebulous" (broad) lines due to rapid rotation. This is a known Be star that began behaving as a normal star in November, 1982.

References

B-type main-sequence stars
Be stars

Orion (constellation)
Orionis, f1
BD+16 1035
Orionis, 69
042545
029434
2198